The FC Basel 1900–01 season was their eighth season since the club's foundation on 15 November 1893. The club's new chairman was Ernst-Alfred Thalmann, who took over the presidency from Charlie Volderauer at the AGM. He was the fourth chairman in the club's history. FC Basel played their home games in the Landhof in the Quarter Kleinbasel.

Overview 
The first national championship in Switzerland took place in 1897–98. This championship is considered as unofficial because it was not organized by the Swiss Football Association (SFA; founded in 1895). FC Basel did not participate in this first championship. But they did in the second edition during the season 1898–99.  The club did not compete in the following season either. But they have participated in every season since.

Alphonse Schorpp was nominated as team captain by the club's board of directors under chairman Ernst-Alfred Thalmann. Schorpp led the team trainings and was responsible for the line-ups. In the previous season the team played 16 friendly games. In this season they played eight friendlies and ten games in the league. There is no documentation that shows that there were pre-season friendly games this season, but there were during the winter break, four at home in the Landhof and one in Neuchâtel. At the end of the season the team twice travelled to Mulhouse, played once against FC Mulhouse and once against an Alsace selection. Of the eight friendlies four were won and two were drawn.

The Serie A 1900–01 was divided into two groups, an east and a west group. Basel were with three teams from Zürich, Grasshopper Club Zürich, FC Zürich, Fire Flies Zürich and two other teams from Basel, Old Boys and Fortuna Basel. There were four teams in the west group. The start into the season with a home draw against Fire Flies and an away victory against local rivals can be considered as good. However, in the remaining eight games the team managed only one more draw and a forfait win. 

A fact is that Basel did not win a single match in the Landhof. Following the draw with Fire Flies, the team suffered four successive home defeats. A further curiosity in this season was that captain Schorpp scored his first league goal for his club on 3 March 1901 in the away game against Grasshopper Club. In fact he scored two goals, but this could not save the team from a 3–13 defeat. The reasons for this high defeat can be explained with the fact that one of the players missed the train and that the team played with a number of players from their reserve team. Apart from their surnames, Mislan, Pflüger and Trenchard Chaffey, hardly anything else is known of these three gentlemen. Despite the fact that Trenchard Chaffey scored the third Basel goal in this game, he only played in one more league game. Pflüger was documented as player in three friendlies, but the name Mislan can only be found on this one match sheet. Nevertheless, to date this remains the teams' highest and biggest defeat in the club's history.

As mentioned, Basel ended the season with two victories, two draws and six defeats in fifth position in the east group. From this group the Grasshopper Club qualified themselves for the finals against FC Bern, who were the winners of the west group. The final on 31 March was replayed because a player in GC team was non-qualified and GC won the replay to become Swiss champions for the second successive season.

Players

Results 

Legend

Friendly matches

Winter break

End of season

Serie A

East group matches

East group league table

See also 
 History of FC Basel
 List of FC Basel players
 List of FC Basel seasons

Notes

Footnotes 

FCB-GC, FCZ-FCB, FFZ-FCB, FCB-OB, FCB-FCZ

References

Sources 
 Rotblau: Jahrbuch Saison 2014/2015. Publisher: FC Basel Marketing AG. 
 Die ersten 125 Jahre. Publisher: Josef Zindel im Friedrich Reinhardt Verlag, Basel. 
 Switzerland 1900-01 at RSSSF
''(NB: Despite all efforts, the editors of these books and the authors in "Basler Fussballarchiv" have failed to be able to identify all the players, their date and place of birth or date and place of death, who played in the games during the early years of FC Basel. Much documentation for this season is missing, most goal scorers remain unknown.)

External links
 FC Basel official site

FC Basel seasons
Basel